Wattle Ridge may refer to:
 Wattle Ridge, New South Wales, a locality in Wingecarribee Shire, New South Wales, Australia
 Wattle Ridge, Queensland, a locality in the Toowoomba Region, Queensland, Australia